George W. Trenwith  (18511890) was a major league baseball player in 1875. He played with the Philadelphia Centennials and  New Haven Elm Citys.

Sources

1851 births
1890 deaths
Baseball players from Philadelphia
Major League Baseball third basemen
Philadelphia Centennials players
New Haven Elm Citys players
19th-century baseball players